Rukometni klub Radnički, commonly referred to as Radnički Kragujevac, is a men's and women's professional handball club based in Kragujevac, Serbia. It's a part of the Radnički multi-sports company. The men's team competes in Serbian Handball Super League, while women's team competes in Serbian First League for Women.

History
The club is founded in 1964.

The men's team finished the 2013–14 season occupying the second place with 15 points (same as the defending champion, Vojvodina) in the Serbian Handball Super League play-off. That finish qualified them to compete in the EHF Challenge Cup as well as the SEHA Gazprom League. The men's team finished the 2014–15 season in the Serbian Handball Super League play-off on fifth place with six points, however, getting the chance to compete in the EHF Cup qualifying stage in 2015–16 season due to Partizan dropping out of the competition.

Notable male players
  Nemanja Grbović
  Vuk Lazović
  Milan Đukić
  Nemanja Ilić
  Ivan Mošić
  Zoran Nikolić

External links
  
 
 RK Radnički at EHF

SPD Radnički
Serbian handball clubs
Sport in Kragujevac
Women's handball in Serbia